Noa at 17 (Hebrew: נועה בת 17) is a 1982 Israeli drama written and directed by Itzhak Zepel Yeshurun. It was shot over only two weeks. In 2003, actress Dahlia Shimko reprised her role as Noa in the director's sequel, No Longer 17.

Plot
Amid the political turmoil of the early 1950s in Israel, Noa (Dalia Shimko) is a fiercely independent 17-year-old member of a youth movement who finds herself in disagreement with her parents and her collective-minded, Zionist friends.  She is caught between her desire to join a kibbutz and her parents' wish for her to graduate high school. At the same time, Noa's struggle is also part of a larger argument that divides the young nation. The bitter ideological battle taking place within the kibbutz movement following the Doctor's plot on whether to follow the model of the Soviet Union or that of the capitalist west threatens to fracture families, friendships and whole communities. Noa must fight for her individuality, her right to doubt and question all belief systems, but in the end finds herself isolated and disillusioned.

Cast
 Dalia Shimko as Noa
 Adi Ne'eman
 Osnat Ofer
 Shmuel Shilo as Shraga
 Idit Tzur as Bracha
 Moshe Havazelet

Critical reception
The film received high critical praise and relative success at the box office, selling some 190,000 tickets.

References

External links
 

1980s Hebrew-language films
1982 films
Films about the kibbutz
Israeli teen drama films
Films set in the 1950s
1980s teen drama films
1982 drama films